Leonard Glover (born 31 January 1944) is a retired footballer who played as a winger for Charlton Athletic and Leicester City. Considered one of the greatest players to don a Leicester City shirt and once described as the "best uncapped winger in the world", the acerbic and quick-witted Cockney is often referred to in Frank Worthington's seminal "One Hump or Two": for example, when locally born defender Alan Woollett's dog died manager Jimmy Bloomfield tried to get his players to show respectful sympathy towards the defender — a feat Glover was singularly unable to do. While at Leicester he helped them win the 1971 FA Charity Shield. Later, he had a spell at Kettering Town, and a spell as joint manager of Harlow Town with Bobby Kellard, and since the 2006 World Cup a hard hitting blog.

Glover was the captain of the Tampa Bay Rowdies during the 1977 NASL season. He served as the Rowdies' caretaker manager for one game in June 1977 after Eddie Firmani abruptly resigned, and before John Boyle was hired on to finish the season.

External links
 NASL stats

Notes

Living people
1944 births
English footballers
Association football midfielders
FA Cup Final players
English Football League players
North American Soccer League (1968–1984) indoor players
North American Soccer League (1968–1984) players
Charlton Athletic F.C. players
Leicester City F.C. players
Kettering Town F.C. players
Tampa Bay Rowdies (1975–1993) players
Shepshed Dynamo F.C. players
Harlow Town F.C. players
Player-coaches
English football managers
Tampa Bay Rowdies coaches
English expatriate footballers
English expatriate sportspeople in the United States
Expatriate soccer players in the United States